Rosie Rushton is a British author. Rosie Rushton began her career as a feature writer for a local paper. 

Staying Cool, Surviving School was her first book, published by Piccadilly Press in 1993. After writing another non-fiction title, You’re My Best Friend, I Hate You! (available from Puffin)

Writing career 
Rosie Rushton began her career as a feature writer for a local paper. Staying Cool, Surviving School was her first book, published by Piccadilly Press in 1993. After writing another non-fiction title, You’re My Best Friend, I Hate You! (available from Puffin Books), Rosie turned to fiction.

Bibliography

The Leehampton series 
Just Don't Make a Scene, Mum! (1995)
I Think I'll Just Curl Up and Die! (1995)
How Could You Do This To Me, Mum? (1996)
Where Do We Go From Here?/Does Anyone Ever Listen? (1999)

Best Friends 
Best Friends Together (1998)
Best Friends Getting Sorted (1999)
Best Friends in Love (1999)

What a Week 
What a Week Omnibus Books 1-3:
What a Week to Fall in Love (1998)
What a Week to Make it Big (1998)
What a Week to Break Free (1998)
 What a Week Omnibus Books 4-6:
What a Week to Make a Stand (1999)
What a Week to Play It Cool (1999)
What a Week to Make a Move (2001)
What a Week to Take a Chance (2004)
What a Week to Get Real (2005)
What a Week to Risk it All (2006)

21st century Austen 
The Secrets of Love (2005)
Summer of Secrets (2007)
Secret Schemes and Daring Dreams (2008)
Love, Lies and Lizzie (2009)
Echoes of Love (2010)
Whatever Love Is (2012)

Other books 
Staying Cool, Surviving School (1993)
You're My Best Friend - I Hate You! (1994)
Poppy (1996)
Olivia (1997)
Sophie (1998)
Melissa (1998)
Jessica (2000)
Life Line (1999)
PS He’s Mine (2000)
Break Point (2001)
Tell Me I’m OK, really (2001)
Last Seen Wearing Trainers (2002)
All Change! (2000)
Fall Out! (2002)
Waving Not Drowning (2003)
Friends, Enemies and Other Tiny Problems (2003)
The Greatest Love Story Ever Told (2013, Kevin Mayhew). The gospel retold for teenagers.

References

External links 

Piccadilly Press Ltd. official site

20th-century English novelists
21st-century English novelists
Living people
English women novelists
21st-century English women writers
20th-century English women writers
Year of birth missing (living people)